Captain Arthur Jaques (7 March 1888 – 27 September 1915) was an English first-class cricketer. Jaques was a right-handed batsman who bowled leg break and medium pace.

Jaques made his first-class debut for the Marylebone Cricket Club on their tour to the West Indies, playing his first match for the club against Barbados. Jaques played 8 matches on tour for the club, with his final match coming against British Guiana. In his 8 first-class matches on the tour Jaques scored 106 runs at a batting average of 11.77 and a high score of 48. With the ball Jaques took 5 wickets on tour at a bowling average of 29.00, with best figures of 2-31.

The following year Jaques joined Hampshire for the 1913 County Championship, making his debut against Derbyshire. Jaques represented Hampshire in 49 first-class matches from 1913 to 1914, with his final first-class appearance for the county coming against Kent in the 1914 County Championship, which was brought to an early end by the onset of the First World War.

In his 49 first-class matches for the county Jaques took 168 wickets at a bowling average of 21.52, with 10 five wicket hauls, 3 ten wicket hauls in a match and best figures of 8/21 against Somerset in 1914. With the bat Jaques scored 864 runs at an average of 13.50, with one half century score of 68 against Worcestershire in 1914. In addition Jaques took 28 catches in the field for Hampshire.

In addition to playing first-class matches for Hampshire and the Marylebone Cricket Club, Jaques also represented the Gentlemen in two Gentlemen v Players matches in 1914. Jacques also made a single first-class appearance for L Robinson's XI against JR Mason's XI in 1913.

World War I service and death
Jaques served in the First World War with the West Yorkshire Regiment, where he reached the rank of captain. Jaques was killed in action at Loos, France on 27 September 1915. He was commemorated at the Stoneham War Shrine in Hampshire.

References

External links
Arthur Jaques at Cricinfo
Arthur Jaques at CricketArchive
Matches and detailed statistics for Arthur Jaques

1888 births
1915 deaths
Sportspeople from Shanghai
English cricketers
Marylebone Cricket Club cricketers
Hampshire cricketers
British Army personnel of World War I
West Yorkshire Regiment officers
British military personnel killed in World War I
Gentlemen cricketers
L. G. Robinson's XI cricketers